The following lists events that happened in the year 1989 in Brazil.

Incumbents

Federal government
 President: José Sarney
 Vice President: vacant

Governors 
 Acre: Flaviano Melo (until 2 March); Édison Simão Cadaxo (starting 2 March)
 Alagoas: Fernando Collor de Mello (till 14 May); Moacir Andrade (from 14 May)
 Amazonas: Amazonino Mendes 
 Bahia: Waldir Pires then Nilo Moraes Coelho
 Ceará: Tasso Jereissati
 Espírito Santo: Max Freitas Mauro
 Goiás: Henrique Santillo
 Maranhão: Epitácio Cafeteira 
 Mato Grosso: Carlos Bezerra
 Mato Grosso do Sul: Marcelo Miranda Soares
 Minas Gerais: Newton Cardoso
 Pará: Hélio Gueiros 
 Paraíba: Tarcísio Burity
 Paraná: Alvaro Dias 
 Pernambuco: Miguel Arraes 
 Piauí: Alberto Silva 
 Rio Grande do Norte: Geraldo José Ferreira de Melo 
 Rio de Janeiro: Moreira Franco
 Rio Grande do Sul: Pedro Simon  
 Rondônia: Jerônimo Garcia de Santana 
 Roraima: Romero Jucá 
 Santa Catarina: Pedro Ivo Campos 
 São Paulo: Orestes Quércia 
 Sergipe: Antônio Carlos Valadares
 Tocantins: José Wilson Siqueira Campos (from 1 January)

Vice governors
 Acre: Edison Simão Cadaxo 
 Alagoas: Moacir Andrade (until 14 May); vacant thereafter (from 14 May)
 Amazonas: Vivaldo Barros Frota 
 Bahia: Nilo Moraes Coelho (until 14 May); vacant thereafter (from 14 May)
 Ceará: Francisco Castelo de Castro 
 Espírito Santo: Carlos Alberto Batista da Cunha 
 Goiás: Joaquim Domingos Roriz 
 Maranhão: João Alberto Souza 
 Mato Grosso: Edison Freitas de Oliveira 
 Mato Grosso do Sul: George Takimoto 
 Minas Gerais: Júnia Marise de Azeredo Coutinho
 Pará: Hermínio Calvinho Filho 
 Paraíba: vacant
 Paraná: Ary Veloso Queiroz 
 Pernambuco: Carlos Wilson Rocha de Queirós Campos 
 Piauí: Lucídio Portela Nunes 
 Rio de Janeiro: Francisco Amaral
 Rio Grande do Norte: Garibaldi Alves 
 Rio Grande do Sul: Sinval Sebastião Duarte Guazzelli 
 Rondônia: Orestes Muniz Filho
 Santa Catarina: Casildo João Maldaner 
 São Paulo: Almino Afonso 
 Sergipe: Benedito de Figueiredo
 Tocantins: Darci Martins Coelho

Events

January 
 January 1 - Tocantins, Brazil's 25th state, is established.

November 
 November 15: In the centenary of the Proclamation of the Republic, Brazil holds its first democratic presidential elections since 1960, following the military regime (1964–85).

December 
 December 17: The second round of the elections is disputed between Fernando Collor and Luiz Inácio Lula da Silva. Collor wins with 53% of the votes.

Births
February 13 – Rodrigo Possebon, Brazilian-born footballer
June 11 – Ana Clara Duarte, tennis player
July 28 – Felipe Kitadai, judoka

Deaths

References

See also 
1989 in Brazilian football
1989 in Brazilian television

 
1980s in Brazil
Years of the 20th century in Brazil
Brazil
Brazil